Sibahle Mtongana (born 10 December 1984), professionally known as Siba Mtongana is a South African celebrity chef and television presenter known as the host of the Cooking Channel show Siba's Table. She is currently a judge on Chopped South Africa, alongside Jenny Morris and David van Staden.

Early life

Mtongana grew up in the township of Mdantsane near East London, South Africa. She is the daughter of Noliza, a retired teacher and Mncedisi Mnwana, a retired supervisor of a leather goods manufacturer. She is the youngest in a family of six children.

Personal life
Siba is married to Brian Mtongana. She and Brian have 4 kids: Lonwabo, Linamandla, Buhlebenkosi & Ntandoyenkosi.

References

Food Network chefs
Living people
South African chefs
Women chefs
South African cookbook writers
1984 births